The 1963–64 New York Rangers season was the franchise's 38th season. The highlight of the season was trading for goaltender Jacques Plante.

Offseason 
On June 4, 1963, Plante was traded to the New York Rangers, with Phil Goyette and Don Marshall in exchange for Gump Worsley, Dave Balon, and Leon Rochefort.

Final standings

Regular season

Record vs. opponents

Schedule and results

Regular season 

|- align="center" bgcolor="#FFBBBB"
| 1 || 9 || @ Chicago Black Hawks || 3–1 || 0–1–0
|- align="center" bgcolor="#FFBBBB"
| 2 || 12 || @ Montreal Canadiens || 6–2 || 0–2–0
|- align="center" bgcolor="#CCFFCC"
| 3 || 16 || Detroit Red Wings || 3–0 || 1–2–0
|- align="center" bgcolor="#CCFFCC"
| 4 || 20 || Boston Bruins || 5–1 || 2–2–0
|- align="center" bgcolor="#CCFFCC"
| 5 || 24 || @ Boston Bruins || 2–0 || 3–2–0
|- align="center" bgcolor="#FFBBBB"
| 6 || 26 || @ Toronto Maple Leafs || 6–4 || 3–3–0
|- align="center" bgcolor="#FFBBBB"
| 7 || 27 || Chicago Black Hawks || 4–1 || 3–4–0
|- align="center" bgcolor="#CCFFCC"
| 8 || 30 || Boston Bruins || 4–3 || 4–4–0
|- align="center" bgcolor="#FFBBBB"
| 9 || 31 || @ Detroit Red Wings || 4–1 || 4–5–0
|-

|- align="center" bgcolor="#FFBBBB"
| 10 || 3 || Montreal Canadiens || 5–3 || 4–6–0
|- align="center" bgcolor="#FFBBBB"
| 11 || 5 || @ Chicago Black Hawks || 3–2 || 4–7–0
|- align="center" bgcolor="#FFBBBB"
| 12 || 7 || @ Detroit Red Wings || 1–0 || 4–8–0
|- align="center" bgcolor="#FFBBBB"
| 13 || 9 || @ Montreal Canadiens || 4–2 || 4–9–0
|- align="center" bgcolor="#FFBBBB"
| 14 || 14 || Toronto Maple Leafs || 5–4 || 4–10–0
|- align="center" bgcolor="#FFBBBB"
| 15 || 16 || @ Toronto Maple Leafs || 5–4 || 4–11–0
|- align="center" bgcolor="#CCFFCC"
| 16 || 17 || Detroit Red Wings || 5–2 || 5–11–0
|- align="center" bgcolor="white"
| 17 || 20 || Boston Bruins || 1–1 || 5–11–1
|- align="center" bgcolor="white"
| 18 || 24 || Toronto Maple Leafs || 3–3 || 5–11–2
|- align="center" bgcolor="#CCFFCC"
| 19 || 27 || Detroit Red Wings || 3–2 || 6–11–2
|- align="center" bgcolor="#FFBBBB"
| 20 || 28 || @ Boston Bruins || 5–3 || 6–12–2
|- align="center" bgcolor="#FFBBBB"
| 21 || 30 || Chicago Black Hawks || 3–2 || 6–13–2
|-

|- align="center" bgcolor="white"
| 22 || 1 || @ Chicago Black Hawks || 3–3 || 6–13–3
|- align="center" bgcolor="#FFBBBB"
| 23 || 5 || @ Montreal Canadiens || 4–2 || 6–14–3
|- align="center" bgcolor="#FFBBBB"
| 24 || 7 || @ Boston Bruins || 8–6 || 6–15–3
|- align="center" bgcolor="white"
| 25 || 8 || Boston Bruins || 2–2 || 6–15–4
|- align="center" bgcolor="#FFBBBB"
| 26 || 11 || Chicago Black Hawks || 6–2 || 6–16–4
|- align="center" bgcolor="#FFBBBB"
| 27 || 12 || @ Montreal Canadiens || 6–4 || 6–17–4
|- align="center" bgcolor="#FFBBBB"
| 28 || 14 || @ Toronto Maple Leafs || 5–3 || 6–18–4
|- align="center" bgcolor="#CCFFCC"
| 29 || 15 || Montreal Canadiens || 4–2 || 7–18–4
|- align="center" bgcolor="white"
| 30 || 18 || Detroit Red Wings || 1–1 || 7–18–5
|- align="center" bgcolor="white"
| 31 || 22 || Toronto Maple Leafs || 1–1 || 7–18–6
|- align="center" bgcolor="#FFBBBB"
| 32 || 25 || @ Detroit Red Wings || 4–3 || 7–19–6
|- align="center" bgcolor="#CCFFCC"
| 33 || 27 || Chicago Black Hawks || 4–2 || 8–19–6
|- align="center" bgcolor="#FFBBBB"
| 34 || 29 || Montreal Canadiens || 6–2 || 8–20–6
|-

|- align="center" bgcolor="#CCFFCC"
| 35 || 1 || @ Chicago Black Hawks || 5–2 || 9–20–6
|- align="center" bgcolor="#CCFFCC"
| 36 || 4 || Detroit Red Wings || 5–2 || 10–20–6
|- align="center" bgcolor="#CCFFCC"
| 37 || 5 || Toronto Maple Leafs || 3–2 || 11–20–6
|- align="center" bgcolor="#CCFFCC"
| 38 || 9 || @ Boston Bruins || 5–3 || 12–20–6
|- align="center" bgcolor="#FFBBBB"
| 39 || 12 || @ Detroit Red Wings || 5–3 || 12–21–6
|- align="center" bgcolor="#CCFFCC"
| 40 || 15 || @ Toronto Maple Leafs || 5–4 || 13–21–6
|- align="center" bgcolor="#FFBBBB"
| 41 || 18 || @ Chicago Black Hawks || 6–1 || 13–22–6
|- align="center" bgcolor="#CCFFCC"
| 42 || 19 || @ Detroit Red Wings || 3–1 || 14–22–6
|- align="center" bgcolor="#CCFFCC"
| 43 || 22 || Boston Bruins || 6–4 || 15–22–6
|- align="center" bgcolor="#FFBBBB"
| 44 || 23 || @ Montreal Canadiens || 4–2 || 15–23–6
|- align="center" bgcolor="white"
| 45 || 25 || @ Toronto Maple Leafs || 1–1 || 15–23–7
|- align="center" bgcolor="#CCFFCC"
| 46 || 26 || Detroit Red Wings || 3–2 || 16–23–7
|- align="center" bgcolor="#CCFFCC"
| 47 || 30 || @ Boston Bruins || 3–1 || 17–23–7
|-

|- align="center" bgcolor="white"
| 48 || 1 || Chicago Black Hawks || 2–2 || 17–23–8
|- align="center" bgcolor="#CCFFCC"
| 49 || 2 || Montreal Canadiens || 4–2 || 18–23–8
|- align="center" bgcolor="#FFBBBB"
| 50 || 5 || Boston Bruins || 3–2 || 18–24–8
|- align="center" bgcolor="#FFBBBB"
| 51 || 6 || @ Boston Bruins || 4–0 || 18–25–8
|- align="center" bgcolor="#FFBBBB"
| 52 || 8 || Montreal Canadiens || 8–2 || 18–26–8
|- align="center" bgcolor="#FFBBBB"
| 53 || 9 || @ Detroit Red Wings || 4–2 || 18–27–8
|- align="center" bgcolor="#FFBBBB"
| 54 || 12 || @ Chicago Black Hawks || 5–2 || 18–28–8
|- align="center" bgcolor="#CCFFCC"
| 55 || 16 || Toronto Maple Leafs || 4–2 || 19–28–8
|- align="center" bgcolor="#FFBBBB"
| 56 || 19 || Chicago Black Hawks || 7–2 || 19–29–8
|- align="center" bgcolor="#FFBBBB"
| 57 || 22 || @ Toronto Maple Leafs || 5–2 || 19–30–8
|- align="center" bgcolor="#FFBBBB"
| 58 || 23 || Toronto Maple Leafs || 4–3 || 19–31–8
|- align="center" bgcolor="#CCFFCC"
| 59 || 27 || @ Boston Bruins || 4–2 || 20–31–8
|- align="center" bgcolor="#FFBBBB"
| 60 || 29 || @ Montreal Canadiens || 4–0 || 20–32–8
|-

|- align="center" bgcolor="white"
| 61 || 1 || Detroit Red Wings || 2–2 || 20–32–9
|- align="center" bgcolor="#CCFFCC"
| 62 || 4 || Chicago Black Hawks || 4–3 || 21–32–9
|- align="center" bgcolor="#CCFFCC"
| 63 || 7 || @ Montreal Canadiens || 3–2 || 22–32–9
|- align="center" bgcolor="white"
| 64 || 8 || Montreal Canadiens || 0–0 || 22–32–10
|- align="center" bgcolor="#FFBBBB"
| 65 || 11 || Boston Bruins || 5–3 || 22–33–10
|- align="center" bgcolor="#FFBBBB"
| 66 || 14 || @ Toronto Maple Leafs || 7–3 || 22–34–10
|- align="center" bgcolor="#FFBBBB"
| 67 || 15 || Toronto Maple Leafs || 3–1 || 22–35–10
|- align="center" bgcolor="#FFBBBB"
| 68 || 17 || @ Chicago Black Hawks || 4–0 || 22–36–10
|- align="center" bgcolor="#FFBBBB"
| 69 || 19 || @ Detroit Red Wings || 9–3 || 22–37–10
|- align="center" bgcolor="#FFBBBB"
| 70 || 22 || Montreal Canadiens || 2–1 || 22–38–10
|-

Playoffs 
The Rangers failed to qualify for the playoffs.

Player statistics 
Skaters

Goaltenders

†Denotes player spent time with another team before joining Rangers. Stats reflect time with Rangers only.
‡Traded mid-season. Stats reflect time with Rangers only.

Draft picks 
New York's picks at the 1963 NHL Amateur Draft in Montreal, Quebec, Canada.

Awards and honors

References

External links
 Rangers on Hockey Database

New York Rangers seasons
New York Rangers
New York Rangers
New York Rangers
New York Rangers
Madison Square Garden
1960s in Manhattan